Lortkipanidze is a Georgian surname. Notable persons with that name include:
Archil Lortkipanidze (born 1970), Georgian fencer
Konstantine Lortkipanidze (1905–1986), Georgian translator, writer and screenwriter.
Mariam Lortkipanidze (1922–2018), Soviet and Georgian historian
Vazha Lortkipanidze (born 1949), Georgian politician

See also
 Lortkipanidze, a Georgian noble family

Georgian-language surnames